The Brackenridge Park Bridge is a historic iron Lenticular truss bridge located in San Antonio, Texas. The bridge was built in 1890 and remains open for vehicular and pedestrian traffic. The bridge is a contributing property to the Brackenridge Park Historic District, which was listed on the National Register of Historic Places in August 2011.

History
The earliest reference to a bridge spanning the San Antonio River was made in 1736, with river crossings in the city remaining largely dependent on wooden bridges for over 130 years. These wooden bridges, often crudely built, were susceptible to rot and often damaged during flooding events. It was not until 1868 that the first iron bridge was constructed in the city. This was an  pedestrian footbridge built by Boston-based Moseley Ironworks at St. Mary’s Street. While additional iron bridges were planned by the city in the 1870s and 1880s, budget constraints limited such construction. During these two decades, only one additional iron bridge was constructed. This was the Houston Street bridge, built between 1871 and 1873. It was not until more than 15 years after the completion of this bridge before additional iron bridges would be built in the city. 

The Brackenridge Park Bridge was originally designed and built by the Berlin Iron Bridge Company in 1890, one of five such iron bridges commissioned by the city from the company in that year. The bridge was originally located Downtown at St. Mary's Street, where it spanned the San Antonio River. Atop the truss, the bridge is decorated with a gold-colored plaque and ornamentation. The plaque includes the name of the builder, city engineer, mayor, and the date of construction. The decision by Mayor Bryan Callaghan Jr. to place his name on the plaque in gold letters stirred local controversy, with his re-election efforts becoming known as the "Letters of Gold Campaign."  

In the aftermath of the destructive 1921 floods, massive rebuilding work was conducted to improve downtown infrastructure. In 1925, as part of these efforts, the bridge was moved to its current location at Brackenridge Road within Brackenridge Park, where it still crosses the San Antonio River. Three of the sister bridges also constructed by the Berlin Iron Bridge Company remain downtown at the Augusta, Crockett, and South Presa street river crossings.

Photos

See also

List of bridges documented by the Historic American Engineering Record in Texas
List of bridges on the National Register of Historic Places in Texas

References

External links
Photos, Facts, and Additional Information at Bridgehunter (Historic Bridge Foundation)
Photos and Bridge Facts at HistoricBridges.org

Buildings and structures in San Antonio
Transportation in San Antonio
Bridges completed in 1890
Truss bridges in the United States
Historic American Engineering Record in Texas
Lenticular truss bridges in the United States
Road bridges on the National Register of Historic Places in Texas
National Register of Historic Places in Bexar County, Texas